Kiasar (also Romanized as Kīāsar; also known as  Kīāsar-e Bālā and Kīāsar-e Pā’īn) is a village in Ashrestaq Rural District, Yaneh Sar District, Behshahr County, Mazandaran Province, Iran. At the 2006 census, its population was 367, in 110 families.

References 

Populated places in Behshahr County